The 2023 MFL Cup is the 1st season of the MFL Cup, the reserve football league in Malaysia for association football clubs. This is the first edition organized by the MFL after the league system restructure with 15 teams confirmed to participate.

Age limit
This reserve league dedicated to players under the age of 23. The MFL has also allowed a quota of 5 over-age players, including 3 foreign players in each team with only 2 players allowed to play for each match.

Format
The tournament is played as follows:
League level: 15 teams are divided into two groups, namely group A will consist of 8 teams and group B will consist of 7 teams each drawn from the Central Zone, North, South, East, Borneo and Club 1 State.
Round 1 Divided into two groups, each team will play at home and away to determine the position in the group. The top four teams in each group will advance to round 2
Round 2 Consists of a group of eight teams, each team will play at home and away to determine the position in the group. The top two teams in the group will advance to the knockout stages
Knockout stage: The knockout stage is the final match to determine the winner, it will be played in a single match.

Teams and stadiums

Draws
The draw ceremony was held on 31 January 2023, at 15:00 (MST) which was broadcast live on youtube MFL.

Round 1

Group A

Group B

Second round

Final

Winner

Top scorers

References

Football in Malaysia